Miss Universe Japan 2015, the Miss Universe Japan pageant, took place in the Hotel Chinzanso Tokyo, Bunkyō-ku, Tokyo, Japan, on March 12, 2015. Keiko Tsuji of Nagasaki crowned her successor Ariana Miyamoto from Nagasaki at the end of the event.

Results

Contestants 

47 contestants participated:

References

Universe Japan
Beauty pageants in Japan